1997 Italian Indoor, Andrea Gaudenzi and Goran Ivanišević were the defending champions but they competed with different partners that year, Gaudenzi with Marc Rosset and Ivanišević with Sasa Hirszon.

Gaudenzi and Rosset lost in the first round to Pablo Albano and Peter Nyborg, as did Hirszon and Ivanišević to David Adams and Andrei Olhovskiy.

Albano and Nyborg won in the final 6–4, 7–6 against Adams and Olhovskiy.

Seeds
Champion seeds are indicated in bold text while text in italics indicates the round in which those seeds were eliminated.

Draw

References
 1997 Italian Indoor Doubles Draw

Milan Indoor
Italian Indoor
Milan